Gerry Luke McDonagh (born 14 February 1998) is an Irish footballer who plays as a forward for National League club Eastleigh. In his career, McDonagh has played in the English Football League for Nottingham Forest, Cambridge United and Tranmere Rovers. He is a former Ireland U19 International.

Playing career

Nottingham Forest

After two years playing at the Nottingham Forest academy, McDonagh made his professional debut as an 80th-minute substitute during a 2–1 loss against Cardiff City on 29 August 2015. In July 2016, McDonagh joined National League side Wrexham on an initial one-month loan deal as cover for the injured Jordan White. McDonagh showed his delight at the prospect of playing first-team football, claiming the loan would be "a good experience as a young player coming in from Nottingham Forest".

McDonagh made his debut for Wrexham as a substitute in place of Shaun Harrad during a 3–2 victory over Guiseley on 9 August 2016, scoring his first senior career goal. Both Harrad and McDonagh scored as Wrexham defeated Bromley 2–1 on 24 October, with Harrad hailing their partnership up front; "Once you've got one striker committing, the other one gets the drop downs".
On 26 November McDonagh scored his first career brace as Wrexham defeated Forest Green Rovers 3–1. His strike partner Harrad scored Wrexham's other goal of the game. On 3 January 2017 McDonagh returned to Nottingham Forest, having scored five goals in twenty-one appearances for Wrexham following an "outstanding" spell at the Welsh club. On 21 January McDonagh was again sent out on loan, this time to EFL League Two club Cambridge United. McDonagh made his debut the same day as a 61st-minute substitute during a 1–3 defeat by Mansfield Town

On 7 July 2017, McDonagh was one of four academy players at Forest to renew his contract ahead of the 2017-18 season, although the length of that contract was not disclosed by the club.

It was confirmed on 27 April 2018 that Gerry had left Nottingham Forest, following the expiry of his contract.

Barnsley
Gerry joined League One side Barnsley on 9 August 2018, with the player linking up with the club's U23 squad managed by Martin Devaney.

Aldershot Town
Gerry signed for National League side Aldershot Town on a youth loan on 7 December 2018. McDonagh made his debut the following day, in a 4–1 away defeat to Harrogate Town.

On 9 January 2019, Aldershot Town made McDonagh's loan deal permanent and signed him on a free transfer. Gerry made 13 appearances in total for Aldershot Town, and departed the club at the end of the 2018–19 season.

Tamworth
McDonagh signed for Southern League Premier Central side Tamworth on 26 February 2020. McDonagh made his debut for Tamworth on 7 March 2020, in a home fixture against Stratford Town which the home team won 4–1.

On 19 September 2020, Tamworth confirmed that Gerry had re-signed for the Southern League Premier Division Central club for the 2020–21 season. McDonagh appeared on the opening day of the season as Tamworth drew 1–1 away at Peterborough Sports, with Gerry coming on as an 82nd-minute substitute for Lindon Meikle.

McDonagh started for Tamworth in a Southern League Premier Division Central home fixture against Barwell on 29 September 2020. Gerry scored his first goal for the club, on the 39th minute, McDonagh beat Barwell goalkeeper Max Bramley to a through ball to head over the goalkeeper, despite the best efforts of defender Jayden Cotterill the ball found its way over the line. The goal proved to be the match winner, with Tamworth running out 2-1 winners.

FC Halifax Town
On 20 August 2021, he signed for National League side FC Halifax Town after a successful trial with the club. On 4 November 2021, McDonagh joined National League North side Kettering Town on a one-month loan deal. He scored his first goal for the club in a 4–0 win against Blyth Spartans. On 6 December 2021, the loan was extended for a further month, where he would score 2 goals and 2 assists in 5 games during his loan period.

Scunthorpe United
On 2 February 2023, McDonagh signed for Scunthorpe United following a spell with Scottish Championship side Cove Rangers.

Eastleigh
On 11 March 2023, McDonagh joined fellow National League club Eastleigh after just four appearances for Scunthorpe United.

International career

Republic of Ireland U17
McDonagh was called up by Republic of Ireland U17 in March 2014, and scored on his debut against Austria U17. Gerry went on to gain five caps, scoring one goal.

Career statistics

References

External links

1998 births
Living people
Republic of Ireland association footballers
Republic of Ireland youth international footballers
Association football forwards
Nottingham Forest F.C. players
Wrexham A.F.C. players
Cambridge United F.C. players
Tranmere Rovers F.C. players
Barnsley F.C. players
Aldershot Town F.C. players
Tamworth F.C. players
FC Halifax Town players
Kettering Town F.C. players
Cove Rangers F.C. players
Scunthorpe United F.C. players
Eastleigh F.C. players
English Football League players
National League (English football) players
Southern Football League players
Scottish Professional Football League players